Sonadia Island is a small island of about , offshore of the Cox's Bazar coast in Chittagong Division, Bangladesh. Sonadia is located at Kutubjom Union in Maheshkhali Upazila, 15 km north-west of Cox's Bazar District Headquarters. It is located at latitude 21.28˝-21.33˝ and longitude 91.50˝-91.56˝. Sonadia Maheshkhali is separated from the main island by a canal.

Transport
Sonadia is seen as a potential deepwater port lying on the Bay of Bengal that could serve the landlocked parts of India, Myanmar and China.

Rail connections have yet to be built, and the question of gauge has yet to be resolved as the following gauges are in use or possible:

 - Bangladesh, India
 - Bangladesh, India, Myanmar, Thailand, etc.
 - China

See also

Transport in Bangladesh
List of islands of Bangladesh

References

External links
 Sonadia Island: Travel Mate

Islands of Bangladesh
Uninhabited islands of Bangladesh
Islands of the Bay of Bengal